This is a list of football (soccer) clubs in Georgia from 2023 season.

Erovnuli Liga

Crystalbet Erovnuli Liga 2023 

 Dila
 Dinamo Batumi
 Dinamo Tbilisi
 FC Gagra
 Saburtalo
 Samgurali
 FC Samtredia
 Shukura
 FC Telavi
 Torpedo Kutaisi

Crystalbet Erovnuli Liga 2 2023 

 Dinamo-2 Tbilisi
 Gareji
 Kolkheti-1913
 Locomotive
 Merani Martvili
 Merani Tbilisi
 FC Rustavi
 Sioni
 FC Spaeri
 WIT Georgia

Liga 3 2023 

 Aragvi
 Borjomi
 Bakhmaro
 Dinamo Zugdidi
 Gori
 Guria
 Irao
 Kolkheti Khobi
 Locomotive-2
 Matchakhela
 Merani-2 Tbilisi
 Saburtalo-2
 Shevardeni 1906
 Shturmi
 Tbilisi City
 Varketili

Liga 4 2023 

 Algeti
 Betlemi
 Chikhura
 Didube 2014
 Gardabani
 Gonio
 Kolkheti-2 1913
 Margveti 2006
 Merani-2 Martvili
 Meshakhte
 Odishi 1919
 Samgurali-2
 Skuri
 Sulori
 Varketili-2
 WIT Georgia-2
 Zestafoni

Regionuli Liga 2023 

 Didube 2014
 Iberia
 Magaroeli
 Samegrelo

Other clubs 
FC Ameri Tbilisi
FC Lajangir United
FC Universiteti Kutaisi
FC Tbilisi Tbilisi
Spartaki Tbilisi
ASMC Sokhumi
FC Mertskhali Zugdidi founded in 1919.
Georgian European FC
Samgurali Tskhaltubo
F.K. Kobuleti
Abuli Akhalkalaki
FC Aisi Kutaisi
Amirani Ochamchire
FC Antsi Tbilisi
FC Zana Abasha
Armazi Mtskheta
Arsenali Tbilisi
Bakhmaro Chokhatauri
FC Betlemi Keda
Chela Darceli
Chkherimela Kharagauli
Chradjvari Tkibuli
Digomi Tbilisi
Dinamo Kutaisi
Durudji Kvareli
Egrisi Senaki
Gantiadi Dmanisi
FC Rkoni Kaspi
Garisi Tetritskaro
Giganti Laituri
Iberia Kareli
Imedi Laituri
Enguri G.E.S. Zugdidi
FC Iveria Khashuri
Kakhaberi Khelvachauri
Kartli Gori
Kazbegi Tbilisi
Madneuli Kazreti
Kodako Tbilisi
Kolkhi Gulripshi
Krtsanisi Tbilisi
Lashkindari Tkvarcheli
Luka Batumi
S.K. Mamisoni Oni
Mamuli Didi Chkoni
Martve Tbilisi
Menavtobe Batumi
Merani Bacho Tbilisi
Mglebi Tbilisi
Mretebi Tbilisi
F.K. Mukhrani
Mziuri Gali
Nadikvari Telavi
Shevardeni 1906 Tbilisi
F.C. Napareuli
Olimpia Khobi
Paravani Ninotsminda
Prema Tbilisi
Rtsmena Kutaisi
Samtskhe Ackuri
Samegrelo Chkhorotsku
Sanavardo Samtredia
Shadrevani 83 Tshaltubo
Shairme Bagdati
Shiraki Dedoplistskaro
Sinatle Tbilisi
FC Surami
A.S.K. Tbilisi
T.O.D.O. Tbilisi
TSU Tbilisi
Tetri Artsivi Tbilisi
Tolia Tbilisi
Trialeti Tsalka
Tusheti Kvemo Alvani
Urioni Tbilisi
Vardzia Aspindza
Zarzma Adigeni
Zgvaia Tsalendjikha
Zhineri Zhinvali
A.S.K. Zugdidi
K.D.K. Kareli
FC Ksani Akhalgori
FC Oira Tiflis 1912–1917
FC 26 Maisi Tbilisi 1918–1921 years
FC Bashi Achuki Kutaisi 1918–1921 years
FC Elva 1942–1944 years (Wehrmacht's Georgian football team)

Georgia
clubs
 
Football clubs